Ust-Maysky District (Uus-Maaya uluuha) is an administrative and municipal district (raion, or ulus), one of the thirty-four in the Sakha Republic, Russia. It is located in the east of the republic and borders with Oymyakonsky District in the northeast, Okhotsky District and Ayano-Maysky District of Khabarovsk Krai in the east and south, Aldansky District in the southwest, Amginsky District in the west, Churapchinsky and Tattinsky Districts in the northwest, and with Tomponsky District in the north. Its administrative center is the urban locality (a settlement) of Ust-Maya. Population:  11,568 (2002 Census);  The population of Ust-Maya accounts for 33.9% of the district's total population.

Geography
The main rivers in the district are the Aldan and its tributaries the Maya and Allakh-Yun.

History
The district was established on May 20, 1931. The administrative centre of the district was Solnechny from 1972–1992, after which it moved to Ust-Maya.

Demographics
As of the 1989 Census, the ethnic composition was as follows:
Russians: 64.2%
Evenks: 9.3%
Yakuts: 7.1%
Evens: 0.2%
other ethnicities: 19.2%

Economy
The economy of the district is mostly based on mining, timber industry, and production of construction materials. There are deposits of gold, lead, zinc, rare metals, and construction materials.

Inhabited localities

Divisional source:

*Administrative centers are shown in bold

References

Notes

Sources
Official website of the Sakha Republic. Registry of the Administrative-Territorial Divisions of the Sakha Republic. Ust-Maysky District. 

Districts of the Sakha Republic
States and territories established in 1931
1931 establishments in the Soviet Union